A Feather in His Hare is a 1948 produced Warner Brothers Looney Tunes animated short, directed by Chuck Jones. It was originally released on February 7, 1948.  The title is yet another pun on "hair".

The short would be the first Bugs Bunny cartoon directed by Chuck Jones that used Robert McKimson's design for Bugs instead of the version Jones used from Super-Rabbit to Hair-Raising Hare, which was a shorter and slightly different version of the character.

Plot
The plot is a twist on the usual Elmer-chasing-Bugs cartoon, with the bunny's pursuer this time being a dopey Native American. The Indian's body shape, along with the glasses he wears, suggest that he is meant to be a parody of Ed Wynn, although the voice does not match.

Most of the episode is spent with Bugs getting vengeance by "thinking up some more deviltry for that Apache." At the climactic moment, Bugs, looking at the camera, says "Imagine this guy! Just who does he think he is to be chasin' me?", the Indian answers, holding Bugs at arrow-point, "Me? Me last Mohican!". "Last of the Mohicans, eh?", Bugs says, "Well, look, Geronimo, cast your eyes skywards." Looking up, he sees several storks carrying infant versions of the goofy Indian, and passes out.

Bugs, laughing hysterically, happens to cast his own eyes skyward, and sees hundreds of storks carrying infant bunnies, who shout, in unison, "Eh, what's up, Pop?" Bugs then passes out, falling on top of the unconscious Indian. Iris-out.

Voice cast
Mel Blanc as Bugs Bunny, Baby Rabbits
Michael Maltese as Indian (uncredited)

Indian's Screams are provided by Mel Blanc

Controversy
This cartoon was one of 12  pulled from Cartoon Network's annual June Bugs marathon in 2001 by order of AOL Time Warner due to ethnic stereotyping.

References

External links
 

Watch A Feather in His Hare

 

1948 films
1948 short films
1948 animated films
Short films directed by Chuck Jones
Looney Tunes shorts
Warner Bros. Cartoons animated short films
Films about Native Americans
Films about hunters
Films scored by Carl Stalling
Bugs Bunny films
1940s Warner Bros. animated short films
Films with screenplays by Michael Maltese